This a list of colleges and educational institutions of the Government of Tamil Nadu.

Tamil Nadu Government's universities 

This is a list of universities operated by the Government of Tamil Nadu.

Arts & science colleges, Education Colleges

Bharathidasan University Tiruchirappalli - controlled college

Bharathidasan University Tiruchirappalli - affiliated Tamil Nadu Government's arts & science colleges

Bharathidasan University Tiruchirappalli - university colleges

Manonmaniam Sundaranar University (MSU), Thirunelveli - affiliated Tamil Nadu Government's arts & science college

Tirunelveli District 
 Govt arts and science college, Kadayanallur taluk, Tirunelveli district
 Government College of Arts & Science (Surandai), Surandai - 627 859, Tirunelveli district
 Rani Anna Government College for Women, Tirunelveli - 627 008
 Government arts and science College, Nagalapuram, 628904, Thoothukudi (DT)

Bharathiar University Coimbatore - Post Graduate Extension Centre

Bharathiar University Coimbatore - affiliated Tamil Nadu Government's arts & science colleges

Periyar University, Salem - affiliated Tamil Nadu Government's arts & science colleges

Salem District 

 Government Arts College (Autonomous),	Salem - 636 007
 Government Arts College for Women, Salem - 636 008
 Government Arts College for co-ed, Salem - 636 116
 Periyar University College of Arts and Science College, Mettur
 Periyar University College of Arts and Science College, Idappadi

Krishnagiri District 
 Government Arts and Science College for Women, Bargur - 635 104
 Government Arts College for Men, Krishnagiri - 635 001
 Government Arts College for Women, Krishnagiri

Dharmapuri District 
 Government Arts College, Dharmapuri - 636 705
 Government Arts and Science College, Harur- 636 903
 Government Arts and Science College, Pappireddipatti -636 905
 Government Arts and Science College, Pennagaram
 Government Arts and Science College For Women,  Karimangalam K

Annamalai University, Chidambaram - affiliated Tamil Nadu Government's arts & science colleges

Cuddalore District 
 Periyar Arts College (Govt), Devanampttinam, Cuddalore - 607 001.
  Government Arts College, C. Mutlur, Chidambaram - Cuddalore Dt - 608 102
 Thiru Kolanjiyappar Government Arts College, Viruthachalam, Cuddalore Dt - 606 001

Thiruvannamalai District 
 paramedical Colleges,  - 604 407
 Government arts College, Thiruvannamalai
 Arignar Anna Government Arts College, Cheyyar - 604407

Vellore District 
 
 Government Thirumagal Mill's College, Gudiyattam
 Muthrangam Government Arts College, Vellore - 632 002
 Ranipet District
 Arignar Anna Government Arts College for Women Walajapet - 632 513

Villupuram District 
 Arignar Anna Government Arts College, 
Villupuram - 605 602

 Thiru A. Govindasamy Government Arts College, Tindivanam- 604 002

Madurai Kamaraj University, Madurai - affiliated Tamil Nadu Government's arts & science colleges

University of Madras - affiliated Tamil Nadu Government institutes 
 Bharathi Women's College
 Dr. Ambedkar Government Arts College
 Presidency College, Chennai
 Quaid-e-Millath Government College for Women
 Queen Mary's College, Chennai
 Loganatha Narayanasamy Government Arts College
 Pachaiyappa's College
 Government Arts College for Men, Nandanam
 Rajeswari Vedachalam Government Arts College, Kanchipuram
 Sri Subramaniya Swamy Govt Arts College, Tiruttani, Tiruvallur (DIST).
 Government College of Arts and Crafts, Chennai
 Government College of Architecture and Sculpture, Mamallapuram
 The Tamil Nadu Institute of Labour Studies
 King Institute of Preventive Medicine and Research

Alagappa University Karaikudi - affiliated Tamil Nadu Government's arts & science colleges

Tamil Nadu Government's arts & science colleges

Engineering & technology colleges

Anna University colleges 

Anna University - Guindy, Chennai Circle:

Anna University - Tharamani, Chennai Circle:

Anna University - Tiruchirappalli Circle:

Anna University - Madurai Circle:

Anna University - Tirunelveli Circle:

Anna University - Coimbatore Circle:

Tamil Nadu Government's engineering and technology colleges 
The engineering and technology colleges operated by the Tamil Nadu government are listed at List of Tamil Nadu Government's Engineering Colleges.

Law colleges 
Tamil Nadu Dr. Ambedkar Law University is a public state university operated by the Tamil Nadu government that has seven constituent colleges within Tamil Nadu.

Veterinary and animal sciences colleges

Tamil Nadu Veterinary and Animal Sciences University's colleges 
The colleges associated with the Tamil Nadu Veterinary and Animal Sciences University are listed in the article on the university.

Fisheries colleges 
The constituent colleges of Tamil Nadu Fisheries University are listed in the university's article.

Medical colleges 
The medical colleges operated by the Tamil Nadu government are listed at List of Tamil Nadu Government's Medical Colleges.

Teachers Education colleges 
All colleges under the Tamil Nadu Teachers Education University.
 Government College of Education, Komarapalayam, Namakkal
 Government College of Education for Women, Coimbatore
 Government College of Education, Vellore
 Institute of Advanced Study in Education
 Lady Willingdon Institute of Advanced Study in Education, Chennai
 Stella Matutina College of Education
 The Government College of education ,Pudukkottai

Polytechnic colleges

Tamil Nadu Government's polytechnic colleges 
 Bharathiar Centenary Memorial Government Women's Polytechnic College, Ettayapuram, BCMW Ettayapuram, 04632-271238
 Central Polytechnic College, Chennai, CPT Chennai, 044-22541929
 Government Polytechnic, Boomandahalli, Dharmapuri, GPT Dharmapuri, 04348293066
 Government Polytechnic, Thiruthuraipoondi, Tiruvarur, GPT Tiruvarur, 04369 224435
 Government Polytechnic College, Aranthangi, Pudukkottai, GPT Aranthangi, Pudukkottai, 04371-224569
 Government Polytechnic College (women's), Chennai, WPT Chennai
 Dr. Dharmambal Government Polytechnic College for Women, Chennai, www.drdgpcw.org
 Government Polytechnic College, Coimbatore,  GPT Coimbatore, 04222573218
 Government Polytechnic College, Theni, GPT Theni,  04546291904
 Government Polytechnic College (women's), Coimbatore, WPT coimbatore, 04222240917
 Government Polytechnic Karaikal, GPT Karaikal, Ariyalur 04368263128,04368263129
Government polytechnic college,Mohanur(GPT MOHANUR),NAMAKKAL(DT),04286255211
 Government Polytechnic College, Karur, GPT Karur, 04323255322
 Government Polytechnic College, Krishnagiri, GPT Krishnagiri, 04343233867
 Government Polytechnic College, Madurai,  GPT Madurai, 0452941141,04522941142
 Government Polytechnic College, Perundurai, GPT Erode
 Government Polytechnic College, Nagercoil, GPT Nagercoil
 Government Polytechnic College, Perambalur, GPT Perambalur, 04328201020
 Government Polytechnic College, Thoothukkudi, GPT Thoothukkudi, 04612311647
 Government Polytechnic College, Tiruvannamalai, GPT Tiruvannamalai, 044-22350525
 Government Polytechnic College, Trichy, GPT Trichy, 04-2552226,      0431-2550922
 Government Polytechnic College, Udhagamandalam (Ooty), The Nilgiris, GPT Udhagamandalam, The Nilgiris, 04232443407
 Thanthai Periyar E V Ramaswamy Government Polytechnic college, Vellore, 0416-2266266,2264265

Industrial training institutes 

The industrial training institutes operated by the Tamil Nadu government are listed at List of Tamil Nadu Government Industrial Training Institutes.

Public institutions

See also 
 Government of Tamil Nadu
 List of Tamil Nadu Government's Engineering Colleges
 List of Tamil Nadu Government's Law Colleges
 List of Tamil Nadu Government's Medical Colleges
 List of Tamil Nadu Government Industrial Training Institutes
 List of Tamil Nadu Government Arts and Science Colleges
 List of Tamil Nadu governmental organisations

References

External links 
 Department of Collegiate Education, Government of Tamil Nadu
 Department of Technical Education, Government of Tamil Nadu
 Department of Medical Education, Government of Tamil Nadu
 Department of Indian Medicine and Homoeopathy Education, Government of Tamil Nadu

Government educational institutions
Government of Tamil Nadu